These are the full results of the athletics competition at the 2014 Lusophone Games which took place on 23–25 and 27 January 2014 in Bambolim in the Indian state of Goa.

Men's results

100 meters

Heats – 23 January

Final – 23 January

200 meters

Heats – 25 January

Final – 25 January

400 meters

Heats – 23 January

Final – 24 January

800 meters
25 January

1500 meters
23 January

5000 meters
24 January

10 kilometers
27 January

110 meters hurdles
24 JanuaryWind: +0.3 m/s

400 meters hurdles
25 January

3000 meters steeplechase
25 January

4 x 100 meters relay
24 January

4 x 400 meters relay
25 January

High jump
25 January

Long jump
23 January

Triple jump
24 January

Shot put
23 January

Women's results

100 meters
23 January

200 meters
25 January

400 meters
24 January

800 meters
25 January

1500 meters
23 January

5000 meters
24 January

10 kilometers
27 January

100 meters hurdles
24 JanuaryWind: -0.2 m/s

400 meters hurdles
25 January

4 x 100 meters relay
24 January

4 x 400 meters relay
25 January

High jump
23 January

Long jump
24 January

Triple jump
25 January

Shot put
24 January

References

External links
Day 1 results
Day 2 results
Day 3 results

Lusophone
2014
2014 Lusofonia Games